Duck's Cross is a hamlet located in the Borough of Bedford in Bedfordshire, England.

The settlement forms part of Colmworth civil parish, though Duck's Cross is located nearer to the villages of Wilden, and Colesden.

References

External links

Hamlets in Bedfordshire
Borough of Bedford